The 2012–13 CEV Challenge Cup was the 33rd edition of the European Challenge Cup volleyball club tournament, the former CEV Cup.

The Italian club Copra Elior Piacenza beat the Russian club Ural Ufa in the final and achieved its first CEV Challenge Cup trophy. Argentinian setter Luciano De Cecco was named the Most Valuable Player of the final tournament.

Final phase

Semi-finals

|}

First leg

|}

Second leg

|}

Final

|}

First leg

|}

Second leg

|}

Final standing

References

External links
 Official site

CEV Challenge Cup
2012 in volleyball
2013 in volleyball